"Dazzling Girl" is the fifth Japanese single of South Korean boy group, Shinee, released on October 10, 2012. This is their first original Japanese single after their previous singles having been remakes of their Korean singles. Shinee ranked as the top-selling Korean artist in Japan for October with "Dazzling Girl". Selling over 109,032 copies in a month, "Dazzling Girl" was certified gold by the Recording Industry Association of Japan (RIAJ) for shipments of over 100,000.

Background and release
On October 3, 2012 EMI released "Dazzling Girl" through iTunes Japan. On November 12, 2012 according to the Recording Industry Association of Japan (RIAJ), "Dazzling Girl" was certified Gold for shipped more than 100,000 albums and placed second on the Oricon Weekly Chart.

Promotion
A preview of "Dazzling Girl" was released in a commercial for Jewelry Maki on August 24, 2012. The song was selected to be the theme song of Japanese television show Sukkiri!! and it began to air with this theme song starting from October 1 for a month.

On October 12, 2012 Shinee performed "Dazzling Girl" for the first time live on the Japanese music show Happy Music. Shinee continued to make appearances at Happy Music for 4 consecutive weeks as guests' comments. They also performed at Hey! Hey! Hey! Music Champ on October 21, 2012 and at Music Japan on October 28, 2012.

Music video
The music video was directed by Hideaki Sunaga. It features the members of Shinee as photographers, stylists, and make-up artists as they prepare a model (played by Natsuki Fujimoto) for a photo shoot.

Track listing

Chart performance

Oricon Chart

Other charts

Certifications

Release history

References

2012 singles
Shinee songs
SM Entertainment singles
Japanese-language songs
House music songs
Songs written by Walter Afanasieff
Songs written by Jeff Miyahara
Songs written by Drew Ryan Scott
2012 songs